Life Story is the debut studio album by American rapper Black Rob. It was released on March 7, 2000 via Bad Boy and Arista. The album was praised by critics for its production and Rob's vocal presence and lyricism being similar to the late Notorious B.I.G. Life Story debuted at number 3 on the Billboard 200 and spawned two singles: "Whoa!" and "Espacio". The album was certified platinum by the Recording Industry Association of America (RIAA) for selling 1,000,000 copies in the United States on August 17, 2000. The LP sold close to 178,000 copies in its first week released

Critical reception

Life Story garnered positive reviews from music critics for its production and Rob's musicianship. Roxanne Blanford of AllMusic commended Rob's vocal delivery for being reminiscent of the "smooth, reserved style" of the Notorious B.I.G. and being able to "construct[s] explicit tales with hooks you can feel and lyrics that stick" concluding that, "[W]ith 20 thoroughly bruising cuts, Black Rob's debut may just succeed in helping Puff Daddy regain the street credibility lost when Combs achieved mainstream/crossover status." Kathryn Farr from Rolling Stone gave praise to Rob's skills as a rapper coming across "like a cocky veteran, spitting grim confessions ("Life Story") and baller mantras ("PD World Tour") without breaking a sweat" and Bad Boy's crew of producers supplying the record with "hook-heavy cuts" despite Puff's "threadbare formulas" from previous efforts threatening to pull it down, concluding that "P. Diddy's meddling aside, though, most of Life Story is, well, like whoa!" Vibe contributor Miguel Burke also praised Rob for being "incredibly adept at constructing graphic, autobiographical episodes and intricate tales" and pointed out Puff's "irritating ad-libs ("Make It Hot")" and "wannabe-rough rhymes ("Down the Line")" as negative qualities, concluding with, "But that doesn't change the fact that although the album gets down and dirty, Life Story is a breath of fresh air."

Track listing

Note
"I Love You Baby" from No Way Out by Puff Daddy and the Family in 1997

Samples 
"Whoa" contains a sample that comes from the instrumental version of François Valéry's song Joy.
"Drive By (Interlude)" contains a sample of "The Days of Pearly Spencer" performed by Raymond Lefèvre
"Lookin' At Us" contains a sample of Terri's Tune" performed by David Axelrod
"Can I Live" contains a sample of "Within the Sound" by Rasa
"B.R." contains a sample from "Yesterdays" by Paul Chambers Quintet
"Thug Story" contains sample from "Children's Story" by Slick Rick
"I Love You Baby" contains a sample of "Xtaby (Lure of the Unknown Love)" performed by Yma Sumac
"Spanish Fly" contains a sample of "La Isla Bonita" by Madonna
"I Dare You" contains a sample of "Under the Influence of Love" performed by Love Unlimited

Personnel
 Executive producer: Sean "Puffy Combs", Harve Pierre and Deric "D-Dot" Angelettie
 Project manager: Kim Lumpkin
 Product/creative manager: Marcus Logan
 A&R: Harve Pierre
 Engineering: Kamel Abdo, Eric Butler, Roger Che, Stephen Dent, Tony Maserati, Michael Patterson, Joe "Smilin' Joe" Perrera, Ed Raso, Tony Smalios, Doug Wilson
 Assistant engineering: Lynn Montrose
 Mixing: Prince Charles Alexander, Roger Che, Michael Patterson, Rob Paustian, Joe "Smilin' Joe" Perrera, Ed Raso
 Programming: Stephen Dent, Harve Pierre, Mario Winans
 Mastering: Herb Powers
 Photography: Jonathan Mannion
 Cover photo: Jonathan Mannion
 Sample clearance: Deborah Mannis-Gardner

Charts and certifications

Weekly charts

Year-end charts

Certifications

See also
List of Billboard number-one R&B albums of 2000

References

2000 debut albums
Black Rob albums
Bad Boy Records albums
Albums produced by Buckwild
Albums produced by Sean Combs